Kenan Cahit Ece (born 24 December 1980) is a Turkish actor.

Life and career
After graduating from St. George's Austrian High School, Ece finished his studies at Davidson College with a degree in theatre and economic studies. While in university, he started taking part in many plays. After graduating, he moved to Dublin, where he lived for four years and took acting lessons at Gaiety School of Acting and Irish Film Academy. He then appeared in 13 episodes of the Irish soap opera Fair City. He then started working at the Irish national theatre, Abbey Theatre. Upon his return to Turkey, he was cast in the movie Yüreğine Sor, directed by Yusuf Kurçenli. He then appeared in the movie Beni Unutma. Ece simultaneously continued his television career with different roles in the TV series Samanyolu, Deli Saraylı, İzmir Çetesi, Krem and Kalp hırsızı. In 2012, together with Mustafa Üstündağ he founded the Çamurdan Theatre. He gained international recognition with his role in the Japanese-Turkish co-production 125 Years Memory. Ece further rose to prominence with his role in the TV series Sadakatsiz.

His grandfather was Turgan Ece, a former football player and manager of Galatasaray S.K., and brother to Keriman Halis Ece. Ece is married to actress Canan Ergüder with whom he has a daughter.

Filmography 

2009 - Yüreğine Sor (Mustafa) (film)
2009 - Masumlar (Kaan) (TV series)
2010 - Deli Saraylı (Emir Zahir) (TV series)
2010 - Gecekondu (Kendisi) (TV program)
2010 - Samanyolu (Namık) (TV series)
2011 - Ay Tutulması (Kenan) (TV series)
2011 - Beni Unutma (Hakan) (film)
2011 - Bul Beni (film)
2011 - İzmir Çetesi (Ateş) (TV series)
2012 - Krem (TV series)
2012 - Sağ Salim (Ayhan) (film)
2012 - Son (TV series)
2012 - Çakallarla Dans 2: Hastasıyız Dede (film)
2014 - Gulyabani (Murat) (film)
2014 - Kalp Hırsızı (Tekin) (TV series)
2015 - Aşk Olsun (film)
2015 - Güllerin Savaşı (TV series)
2015 - 125 Years Memory (Mustafa/Murat) (film)
2017 - Cingöz Recai: Bir Efsanenin Dönüşü (film)
2017 - Ver Kaç (film)
2018 - Avlu (Murat Ünal) (TV series)
2021 - Sadakatsiz (Turgay Güngör) (TV series)

Theatre 
 Islah Evi : Norman Lock - Çamurdan Theatre - 2012
 Bakarsın Bulutlar Gider : Özen Yula - BO Production - 2014

References

External links 
 
 

1980 births
Turkish male film actors
Turkish male stage actors
Turkish male television actors
Living people
Turkish people of Circassian descent